Ctenosia infuscata is a moth of the subfamily Arctiinae. It was described by Oswald Bertram Lower in 1902. It is found in Australia.

References

Lithosiini
Moths described in 1902